Ferdinand Friebe (2 February 1894 – 30 March 1980) was an Austrian middle-distance runner. He competed in the men's 1500 metres at the 1924 Summer Olympics.

References

External links
 

1894 births
1980 deaths
Athletes (track and field) at the 1924 Summer Olympics
Austrian male middle-distance runners
Olympic athletes of Austria
Place of birth missing